D'Arcy Rose (14 August 1888 – 17 August 1964) was an Australian politician and a member of the New South Wales Legislative Assembly  from  1939 until 1959. He was a member of the Country Party.

Life
Rose was born in Ashfield, New South Wales. He was  the son of a company director and as a young man he established seed and produce and real estate businesses on the Central Coast of New South Wales. He later owned a dairy farm in the Upper Hunter Valley.  Rose was elected to the New South Wales Parliament as the Country Party member for the  seat of Upper Hunter at the 1939 by-election caused by the death of the sitting Country Party member Malcolm Brown.  He retained the seat at the next 6 elections and retired at the 1959 election. He did not hold party, parliamentary or ministerial office.

References

 

1888 births
1964 deaths
National Party of Australia members of the Parliament of New South Wales
Members of the New South Wales Legislative Assembly
20th-century Australian politicians